The Yale Bulldogs women's basketball team is the intercollegiate women's basketball program representing Yale University. The school competes in the Ivy League in Division I of the National Collegiate Athletic Association. The Bulldogs, also nicknamed the Elis, play home basketball games at the Payne Whitney Gymnasium in New Haven, Connecticut on the university campus.

Postseason history
The Bulldogs have never played in the NCAA Tournament. Yale won the Ivy League title in 1979, but the Ivy League champion at the time were not regularly invited to the NCAA Tournament. They have made two postseason appearances, the 2011 WNIT and the 2018 WBI.

WNIT results

WBI results

Coaches

References

External links
 

 
Basketball teams established in 1973
1973 establishments in Connecticut